Garlick is the surname of the following people:

Beverly Garlick (born 1944), Australian architect
Cathy Garlick, Australian cricketer
Daniel Garlick (1818–1902), South Australian architect
Gordon Garlick, English cricketer
Jessica Garlick, British singer
Kyle Garlick, American baseball player
Larry Garlick, American chief executive
Nicholas Garlick, English catholic priest and martyr
Raymond Garlick, English poet and editor
Scott Garlick, American soccer player
Sean Garlick, Australian rugby league footballer
Simon Garlick, Australian rules footballer

Fictional characters
Magrat Garlick, a witch  from Terry Pratchett's Discworld series

Surnames